Any Day Now is the eighth studio album by the American solo artist Scott Walker. It was released in May 1973 but failed to chart. "The Me I Never Knew" was released as the album's sole single backed with the opening track of The Moviegoer; "This Way Mary". The album was also the final Walker studio album from Philips Records and he later signed with CBS Records (now Columbia).

Availability
The continued unavailability of Any Day Now is believed to be due to Walker's dissatisfaction with his albums from the period, which he describes in the documentary Scott Walker: 30 Century Man as his "wilderness years". Walker blocked CD re-releases of Any Day Now, Scott: Scott Walker Sings Songs from his TV Series (1969) and The Moviegoer (1972).

In spite of the album's deletion, over half of the songs were released in recent years on the budget The Collection compilation and Classics & Collectibles (2005). "The Me I Never Knew", "We Could Be Flying", "Do I Love You?", "When You Get Right Down to It", "Cowboy", and "All My Love's Laughter" are included on the Classics & Collectibles, while "Any Day Now" is included on The Collection. "If Ships Were Made To Sail" appears on a collection of Jimmy Webb penned songs titled "And Someone Left The Cake Out In The Rain" (1998). "Maria Bethania", "If" and "Ain't No Sunshine" remain unavailable.

Reception

In common with Walker's 1970s output, Any Day Now was poorly received by critics but has been reassessed since Walker was critically reappraised in the decades following The Walker Brothers' 1978 album Nite Flights.

Track listing

Personnel
 Scott Walker - vocals
 Peter Knight - arrangements, conductor
 Robert Cornford - arrangements, conductor on tracks: A4, A6, B1, B5
 John Franz - producer
 Peter J. Olliff - engineer

Release details

References

Scott Walker (singer) albums
1973 albums
Philips Records albums
Albums produced by Johnny Franz